Dark Was the Night (released as Monster Hunter in the UK) is a 2014 American horror film directed and produced by Jack Heller, and written by Tyler Hisel. It stars Kevin Durand, Lukas Haas, and Bianca Kajlich.

Plot
In the forest near the small isolated town of Maiden Woods a team of loggers go inexplicably missing. Unable to contact them the Foreman goes searching for them, finding only a logger's severed arm. He is then violently killed in his truck by an unseen creature.

Later in town Sheriff Paul Shields and his new deputy from New York, Donny Saunders, speak to farmer Ron who insists one of his valuable horses has been stolen, though without evidence of theft it is assumed the horse merely escaped through an open gate. Paul then leaves to pick up his son Adam from his wife Susan who no longer lives with him after the accidental death of their other son, Tim. That night Adam sees a creature in the back yard and when Paul investigates he hears but does not see a large creature in the trees.

The next morning Paul finds large footprints in the snow around his house that appear to come from an animal with hooves that walks on two legs. Donny informs him the footprints are around everybody's houses in the entire town. Paul and Donny follow the footprints into the woods where they also find large claw marks on the trees where the footprints disappear. After hearing from park rangers that no known animal with hooves could walk such a distance on two legs Paul assumes the whole thing is a prank. Paul later hears from the town priest that his dog and a lot of other animals have gone missing. Paul then goes to a local store where Ron's daughter Clair and several hunters confront him with their fears about old Indian stories of creatures living in the woods, though Paul dismisses this. Earl, another hunter, informs Paul that even though it is hunting season, all the deer and other forest animals have disappeared, meaning a large new predator may be in the area.

As Paul drives Adam home they both see a very large creature in the back yard, but when Paul investigates, all he finds is a bridle up a tree that he confirms is from Ron's missing horse. The next day Paul and Susan meet Adam's teacher to talk about how Adam is not dealing with his brother's death, during which Susan becomes angry and upset. Paul meets Donny where they both witness a very large flock of birds in the sky flying south when they should be flying north. Susan tells Donny how Paul was watching their son Tim when he fell, hit his head and died and how he still blames himself even though she doesn't. That night Paul is called to Ron's farm where he sees the creature attempt to enter the horses stables before it flees, leaving behind more footprints showing the hoof is split into 3 sections, even though most cloven hoofed animals only have 2. That night Paul discovers a dead deer that had been mauled in the road but before he can move it the creature suddenly appears and takes the body with it. Donny wonders if it is not simply a forest predator that had not yet been discovered, similar to large fish species thought to be extinct that actually still exist deep in the ocean.

The next day three hunters are attacked by the creature in the woods. Two are killed and one makes it back to town. The bodies of the two dead hunters are later found hidden high in the trees. Paul bans any more hunters from entering the forest and orders everybody in town to stay indoors at night. He also reports the two deaths and calls in 2 dozen park rangers to hunt and kill the creature within 24 hours. That night a heavy snow storm hits the surrounding area and most of the town evacuates. Paul theorizes that the creature had been pushed from its territory by the logging company and is looking for a new home and sees humans as a threat. One of the hunters shows Paul film footage of a large creature walking on two legs. As the storm gets worse the creature breaks into Paul's house, where Paul barricades himself and Adam in the bathroom until the arrival of Donny scares it away.

Paul gathers everybody who did not evacuate into the church, saying it is the safest place for everybody to stay until the park rangers arrive in the morning to hunt and kill the creature. However, the creature attacks the church and Susan manages to motivate Paul into forgiving himself for Tim's death. As the creature breaks into the church Paul leads everybody into the church's basement storm shelter. He tasks the hunters to guard the door then takes Donny to kill the creature.

As they follow the creature through the church Paul and Donny split up. Donny is attacked in the kitchen but manages to shoot the creature with his shotgun. Paul follows the creature only to be attacked and drop his rifle. He flees back into the main hall and hides beneath the pews. However, the creature finds him and he shoots it with his pistol before it disappears. Paul realises it can climb as it suddenly drops down from the ceiling. As it rushes towards him Paul shoots it once again but drops his pistol as it overpowers him. He instead draws his hunting knife and stabs the creature to death.

Returning to the basement Paul tells everybody the creature is dead and leads them back into the church. However, as Donny examines the creature's body he realises he had shot it in the shoulder with his shotgun, yet the wound was suspiciously missing. Paul and Donny suddenly realise there is more than one creature in the church, and outside dozens of creatures are seen swarming over the church roof. One creature lunges at the camera and the screen goes black.

Cast
 Kevin Durand as Paul Shields, Sheriff of Maiden Woods County
 Lukas Haas as Deputy Donny Saunders
 Bianca Kajlich as Susan Shields
 Ethan Khusidman as Adam Shields
 Nick Damici as Earl Lerner
 Steve Agee as The Foreman
 Heath Freeman as Jim
 Sabina Gadecki as Clair
 Minerva Scelza as Mrs. Poplar
 Joseph Pallister as The Hunter
 Charles Parshley as Kyle

Production

Development
Tyler Hisel's screenplay for The Trees (later to become Dark Was the Night) was included in the 2009 Hollywood Blacklist (the annual list of the top 100 screenplays). The film is loosely based on the real-life events that unfolded in Topsham, England in 1855, known as The Devil's Footprints. The small town woke to find freshly fallen snow and biped hoof prints tracing the landscape. Dark Was the Night is said to tell the story of a present-day community's reaction to a similar event.

Filming
Jack Heller directed, and the film is said to include a "never-before-seen monster", drawn from various pieces of American folklore.

Production started in February 2012, filming in Southampton, New York.

Release
Dark Was the Night was released in theaters on July 24, 2015, through Image Entertainment.

Reception
On the review aggregator Rotten Tomatoes, the film holds an approval rating of 52% based on 21 critic reviews with an average score of 6.00/10. On Metacritic, it has a score of 40, indicating "mixed and average reviews."

References

External links

2014 films
2010s thriller films
American monster movies
American thriller films
2010s English-language films
Films shot in New York (state)
2010s monster movies
Wendigos in popular culture
2010s American films